Australia's Todd Woodbridge and Mark Woodforde defeated Great Britain's Neil Broad and Tim Henman in the final, 6–4, 6–4, 6–2 to win the gold medal in Men's Doubles tennis at the 1996 Summer Olympics. It was the fourth of five components the Woodies needed for the career Golden Slam; they would later win the French Open to complete the achievement. It was Australia's first official medal in the event, though Australian player Edwin Flack was a member of a mixed team that won bronze in the 1896 event. Great Britain earned its first medal in the men's doubles since 1924. In the bronze-medal match, Germany's Marc-Kevin Goellner and David Prinosil defeated the Netherlands' Jacco Eltingh and Paul Haarhuis, 6–2, 7–5. It was Germany's second consecutive medal in the event.

The tournament was held from 25 July to 2 August at the Stone Mountain Tennis Center, in Atlanta, Georgia of the United States of America. There were 31 pairs from 31 nations, with each nation limited to one pair (two players),though the pair from Uzbekistan did not start.

Background

This was the 10th appearance of men's doubles tennis. The event has been held at every Summer Olympics where tennis has been on the program: from 1896 to 1924 and then from 1988 to the current program. A demonstration event was held in 1968.

This was the first Olympics at which Todd Woodbridge and Mark Woodforde played together. Woodbridge had played with John Fitzgerald in 1992. Since pairing with Woodforde, the Australians had won four consecutive Wimbledone titles. They were heavy favorites in the Olympic tournament. 1992 silver medalist Wayne Ferreira of South Africa returned, this time paired with (unrelated) Ellis Ferreira rather than Piet Norval. Bronze medalist Javier Frana of Argentina also returned with a new partner, Luis Lobo.

Chinese Taipei, the Czech Republic, Ecuador, the Ivory Coast, Slovakia, and Venezuela each made their debut in the event. Great Britain made its eighth appearance in the event, most of any nation.

Competition format

The competition was a single-elimination tournament. A bronze-medal match was reintroduced after not being held in 1988 or 1992. All matches except the final were best-of-three sets, down from best-of-five in previous Games; the final remained best-of-five. Tiebreaks were used for any set before the third that reached 6–6.

Schedule

All times are Eastern Daylight Time (UTC-4)

Seeds

Draw

Finals

Top half

Bottom half

References

 ITF Olympic Site

1996
Men's Doubles
Men's events at the 1996 Summer Olympics